Helen Adams Keller (June 27, 1880 – June 1, 1968) was an American author, disability rights advocate, political activist and lecturer. Born in West Tuscumbia, Alabama, she lost her sight and her hearing after a bout of illness when she was 19 months old. She then communicated primarily using home signs until the age of seven, when she met her first teacher and life-long companion Anne Sullivan. Sullivan taught Keller language, including reading and writing. After an education at both specialist and mainstream schools, Keller attended Radcliffe College of Harvard University and became the first deafblind person to earn a Bachelor of Arts degree.

Keller worked for the American Foundation for the Blind (AFB) from 1924 until 1968. During this time, she toured the United States and traveled to 35 countries around the globe advocating for those with vision loss.

Keller was also a prolific author, writing 14 books and hundreds of speeches and essays on topics ranging from animals to Mahatma Gandhi. Keller campaigned for those with disabilities, for women's suffrage, labor rights, and world peace. In 1909, she joined the Socialist Party of America. She was a founding member of the American Civil Liberties Union.

Keller's autobiography, The Story of My Life (1903), publicized her education and life with Sullivan. It was adapted as a play by William Gibson, and this was also adapted as a film under the same title, The Miracle Worker. Her birthplace has been designated and preserved as a National Historic Landmark. Since 1954 it has been operated as a house museum and sponsors an annual "Helen Keller Day".

Keller was inducted into the Alabama Women's Hall of Fame in 1971. She was one of twelve inaugural inductees to the newly founded Alabama Writers Hall of Fame on June 8, 2015.

Early childhood and illness

Keller was born on June 27, 1880, in Tuscumbia, Alabama, the daughter of Arthur Henley Keller (1836–1896), and Catherine Everett (Adams) Keller (1856–1921), known as "Kate". Her family lived on a homestead, Ivy Green, that Helen's paternal grandfather had built decades earlier. She had four siblings: two full siblings, Mildred Campbell (Keller) Tyson and Phillip Brooks Keller; and two older half-brothers from her father's first marriage, James McDonald Keller and William Simpson Keller.

Keller's father worked for many years as an editor of the Tuscumbia North Alabamian. He had served as a captain in the Confederate Army.
The family were part of the slaveholding elite before the war, but lost status later. Her mother was the daughter of Charles W. Adams, a Confederate general.

Keller's paternal lineage was traced to Casper Keller, a native of Switzerland. One of Helen's Swiss ancestors was the first teacher for the deaf in Zurich. Keller reflected on this fact in her first autobiography, asserting that "there is no king who has not had a slave among his ancestors, and no slave who has not had a king among his".

At 19 months old, Keller contracted an unknown illness described by doctors as "an acute congestion of the stomach and the brain". Contemporary doctors believe it might have been meningitis, caused by the bacterium Neisseria meningitidis (meningococcus), or possibly Haemophilus influenzae. (This could have caused the same symptoms, but is a less likely cause due to its 97% juvenile mortality rate at that time.) The illness left Keller both deaf and blind. She lived, as she recalled in her autobiography, "at sea in a dense fog".

At that time, Keller was able to communicate somewhat with Martha Washington, who was two years older and the daughter of the family cook, and understood the girl's signs; By the age of seven, Keller had more than 60 home signs to communicate with her family, and could distinguish people by the vibration of their footsteps.

In 1886, Keller's mother, inspired by an account in Charles Dickens' American Notes of the successful education of Laura Bridgman, a deaf and blind woman, dispatched the young Keller and her father to consult physician J. Julian Chisolm, an eye, ear, nose, and throat specialist in Baltimore, for advice.
Chisholm referred the Kellers to Alexander Graham Bell, who was working with deaf children at the time. Bell advised them to contact the Perkins Institute for the Blind, the school where Bridgman had been educated. It was then located in South Boston. Michael Anagnos, the school's director, asked Anne Sullivan, a 20-year-old alumna of the school who was visually impaired, to become Keller's instructor. It was the beginning of a nearly 50-year-long relationship: Sullivan developed as Keller's governess and later her companion.

Sullivan arrived at Keller's house on March 5, 1887, a day Keller would forever remember as my soul's birthday. Sullivan immediately began to teach Helen to communicate by spelling words into her hand, beginning with "d-o-l-l" for the doll that she had brought Keller as a present. Keller initially struggled with lessons since she could not comprehend that every object had a word identifying it. When Sullivan was trying to teach Keller the word for "mug", Keller became so frustrated she broke the mug. Keller remembered how she soon began imitating Sullivan's hand gestures: "I did not know that I was spelling a word or even that words existed. I was simply making my fingers go in monkey-like imitation."

The next month Keller made a breakthrough, when she realized that the motions her teacher was making on the palm of her hand, while running cool water over her other hand, symbolized the idea of "water". Writing in her autobiography, The Story of My Life, Keller recalled the moment:  Keller quickly demanded that Sullivan sign the names of all the other familiar objects in her world.

Helen Keller was viewed as isolated but was very in touch with the outside world. She was able to enjoy music by feeling the beat and she was able to have a strong connection with animals through touch. She was delayed at picking up language, but that did not stop her from having a voice.

Formal education
In May 1888, Keller started attending the Perkins Institute for the Blind. In 1894, Keller and Sullivan moved to New York to attend the Wright-Humason School for the Deaf, and to learn from Sarah Fuller at the Horace Mann School for the Deaf. In 1896, they returned to Massachusetts, and Keller entered The Cambridge School for Young Ladies before gaining admittance, in 1900, to Radcliffe College of Harvard University, where she lived in Briggs Hall, South House. Her admirer, Mark Twain, had introduced her to Standard Oil magnate Henry Huttleston Rogers, who, with his wife Abbie, paid for her education. In 1904, at the age of 24, Keller graduated as a member of Phi Beta Kappa from Radcliffe, becoming the first deaf-blind person to earn a Bachelor of Arts degree. She maintained a correspondence with the Austrian philosopher and pedagogue Wilhelm Jerusalem, who was one of the first to discover her literary talent.

Determined to communicate with others as conventionally as possible, Keller learned to speak and spent much of her life giving speeches and lectures on aspects of her life. She learned to "hear" people's speech using the Tadoma method, which means using her fingers to feel the lips and throat of the speaker. She became proficient at using braille and using fingerspelling to communicate. Shortly before World War I, with the assistance of the Zoellner Quartet, she determined that by placing her fingertips on a resonant tabletop she could experience music played close by.

Companions

Anne Sullivan stayed as a companion to Helen Keller long after she taught her. Sullivan married John Macy in 1905, and her health started failing around 1914. Polly Thomson (February 20, 1885 – March 21, 1960) was hired to keep house. She was a young woman from Scotland who had no experience with deaf or blind people. She progressed to working as a secretary as well, and eventually became a constant companion to Keller.

Keller moved to Forest Hills, Queens, together with Sullivan and Macy, and used the house as a base for her efforts on behalf of the American Foundation for the Blind. "While in her thirties Helen had a love affair, became secretly engaged, and defied her teacher and family by attempting an elopement with the man she loved." He was the fingerspelling socialist "Peter Fagan, a young Boston Herald reporter who was sent to Helen's home to act as her private secretary when lifelong companion, Anne, fell ill."
At the time, her father had died and Sullivan was recovering in Lake Placid and Puerto Rico.
Keller had moved with her mother in Montgomery, Alabama.

Anne Sullivan died in 1936, with Keller holding her hand, after falling into a coma as a result of coronary thrombosis. Keller and Thomson moved to Connecticut. They traveled worldwide and raised funds for the blind. Thomson had a stroke in 1957 from which she never fully recovered and died in 1960. Winnie Corbally, a nurse originally hired to care for Thomson in 1957, stayed on after Thomson's death and was Keller's companion for the rest of her life.

Career, writing and political activities

On January 22, 1916, Keller and Sullivan traveled to the small town of Menomonie in western Wisconsin to deliver a lecture at the Mabel Tainter Memorial Building. Details of her talk were provided in the weekly Dunn County News on January 22, 1916:

A message of optimism, of hope, of good cheer, and of loving service was brought to Menomonie Saturday—a message that will linger long with those fortunate enough to have received it. This message came with the visit of Helen Keller and her teacher, Mrs. John Macy, and both had a hand in imparting it Saturday evening to a splendid audience that filled The Memorial. The wonderful girl who has so brilliantly triumphed over the triple afflictions of blindness, dumbness and deafness, gave a talk with her own lips on "Happiness", and it will be remembered always as a piece of inspired teaching by those who heard it.
Keller became a world-famous speaker and author. She was an advocate for people with disabilities, amid numerous other causes. She traveled to twenty-five different countries giving motivational speeches about Deaf people's conditions. She was a suffragist, pacifist, radical socialist, birth control supporter, and opponent of Woodrow Wilson. In 1915, she and George A. Kessler founded the Helen Keller International (HKI) organization. This organization is devoted to research in vision, health, and nutrition.
In 1916, she sent money to the NAACP, as she was ashamed of the Southern un-Christian treatment of "colored people".

In 1920, Keller helped to found the American Civil Liberties Union (ACLU). She traveled to over 40 countries with Sullivan, making several trips to Japan and becoming a favorite of the Japanese people. Keller met every U.S. president from Grover Cleveland to Lyndon B. Johnson and was friends with many famous figures, including Alexander Graham Bell, Charlie Chaplin and Mark Twain. Keller and Twain were both considered political radicals allied with leftist politics.

Keller, who believed that the poor were "ground down by industrial oppression", wanted children born into poor families to have the same opportunities to succeed that she had enjoyed. She wrote, "I owed my success partly to the advantages of my birth and environment. I have learned that the power to rise is not within the reach of everyone."

In 1909 Keller became a member of the Socialist Party; she actively campaigned and wrote in support of the working class from 1909 to 1921. Many of her speeches and writings were about women's right to vote and the effects of war; in addition, she supported causes that opposed military intervention. She had speech therapy to have her voice understood better by the public. When the Rockefeller-owned press refused to print her articles, she protested until her work was finally published.

She supported Socialist Party candidate Eugene V. Debs in each of his campaigns for the presidency. Before reading Progress and Poverty by Henry George, Helen Keller was already a socialist who believed that Georgism was a good step in the right direction. She later wrote of finding "in Henry George's philosophy a rare beauty and power of inspiration, and a splendid faith in the essential nobility of human nature".

Keller claimed that newspaper columnists who had praised her courage and intelligence before she expressed her socialist views now called attention to her disabilities. The editor of the Brooklyn Eagle wrote that her "mistakes sprung out of the manifest limitations of her development". Keller responded to that editor, referring to having met him before he knew of her political views:

In 1912, Keller joined the Industrial Workers of the World (the IWW, known as the Wobblies), saying that parliamentary socialism was "sinking in the political bog". She wrote for the IWW between 1916 and 1918. In Why I Became an IWW, Keller explained that her motivation for activism came in part from her concern about blindness and other disabilities:

The last sentence refers to prostitution and syphilis, the former a "life of shame" that women used to support themselves, which contributed to their contracting syphilis. Untreated, it was a leading cause of blindness. In the same interview, Keller also cited the 1912 strike of textile workers in Lawrence, Massachusetts for instigating her support of socialism.

Keller supported eugenics which had become popular with new understandings (as well as misapprehensions) of principles of biological inheritance. In 1915, she wrote in favor of refusing life-saving medical procedures to infants with severe mental impairments or physical deformities, saying that their lives were not worthwhile and they would likely become criminals. Keller also expressed concerns about human overpopulation.

From 1946 to 1957 Keller visited 35 countries. In 1948 she went to New Zealand and visited deaf schools in Christchurch and Auckland. She met Deaf Society of Canterbury Life Member Patty Still in Christchurch.

Works 

Keller wrote a total of 12 published books and several articles.

One of her earliest pieces of writing, at age 11, was The Frost King (1891). There were allegations that this story had been plagiarized from The Frost Fairies by Margaret Canby. An investigation into the matter revealed that Keller may have experienced a case of cryptomnesia, which was that she had Canby's story read to her but forgot about it, while the memory remained in her subconscious.

At age 22, Keller published her autobiography, The Story of My Life (1903), with help from Sullivan and Sullivan's husband, John Macy. It recounts the story of her life up to age 21 and was written during her time in college.

In an article Keller wrote in 1907, she brought to public attention the fact that many cases of childhood blindness could be prevented by washing the eyes of every newborn baby with a disinfectant solution. At the time, only a fraction of doctors and midwives were doing this. Thanks to Keller's advocacy, this commonsense public health measure was swiftly and widely adopted.

Keller wrote The World I Live In in 1908, giving readers an insight into how she felt about the world. Out of the Dark, a series of essays on socialism, was published in 1913.

When Keller was young, Anne Sullivan introduced her to Phillips Brooks, who introduced her to Christianity, Keller famously saying: "I always knew He was there, but I didn't know His name!"

Her spiritual autobiography, My Religion, was published in 1927 and then in 1994 extensively revised and re-issued under the title Light in My Darkness. It advocates the teachings of Emanuel Swedenborg, the Christian theologian and mystic who gave a spiritual interpretation of the teachings of the Bible and who claimed that the Second Coming of Jesus Christ had already taken place.

Keller described the core of her belief in these words:

But in Swedenborg's teaching it [Divine Providence] is shown to be the government of God's Love and Wisdom and the creation of uses. Since His Life cannot be less in one being than another, or His Love manifested less fully in one thing than another, His Providence must needs be universal ... He has provided religion of some kind everywhere, and it does not matter to what race or creed anyone belongs if he is faithful to his ideals of right living.

 "The Frost King" (1891)
 The Story of My Life (1903)
 Optimism: an essay (1903) T. Y. Crowell and company
My Key of Life: Optimism (1904), Isbister
 The World I Live In (1908)
The miracle of life (1909) Hodder and Stoughton
The song of the stone wall (1910) The Century co.
 Out of the Dark, a series of essays on socialism (1913)
 Uncle Sam Is Calling (set to music by Pauline B. Story) (1917)
 My Religion (1927; also called Light in My Darkness)
Midstream: my later life (1929) Doubleday, Doran & company 
We bereaved.(1929) L. Fulenwider, Inc
 Peace at eventide (1932) Methuen & co. ltd
Helen Keller in Scotland: a personal record written by herself (1933) Methuen, 212pp
Helen Keller's journal (1938) M. Joseph, 296pp
Let us have faith (1940), Doubleday, & Doran & co., inc. 
Teacher: Anne Sullivan Macy: a tribute by the foster-child of her mind. (1955), Doubleday (publisher)
The open door (1957), Doubleday, 140pp
The faith of Helen Keller (1967)
 Helen Keller: her socialist years, writings and speeches (1967)

Archival material
The Helen Keller Archives in New York are owned by the American Foundation for the Blind. Archival material of Helen Keller stored in New York was lost when the Twin Towers were destroyed in the September 11 attacks.

Later life and death
Keller had a series of strokes in 1961 and spent the last years of her life at her home.

On September 14, 1964, President Lyndon B. Johnson awarded her the Presidential Medal of Freedom, one of the United States' two highest civilian honors. In 1965 she was elected to the National Women's Hall of Fame at the New York World's Fair.

Keller devoted much of her later life to raising funds for the American Foundation for the Blind. She died in her sleep on June 1, 1968, at her home, Arcan Ridge, located in Easton, Connecticut, a few weeks short of her eighty-eighth birthday. A service was held at the Washington National Cathedral in Washington, D.C., and her body was cremated in Bridgeport, Connecticut.  Her ashes were buried at the Washington National Cathedral next to her constant companions, Anne Sullivan and Polly Thomson.

Portrayals

Keller's life has been interpreted many times. She appeared in a silent film, Deliverance (1919), which told her story in a melodramatic, allegorical style.

She was also the subject of the Academy Award-winning 1954 documentary Helen Keller in Her Story, narrated by her friend and noted theatrical actress Katharine Cornell. She was also profiled in The Story of Helen Keller, part of the Famous Americans series produced by Hearst Entertainment.

The Miracle Worker is a cycle of dramatic works ultimately derived from her autobiography, The Story of My Life. The various dramas each describe the relationship between Keller and Sullivan, depicting how the teacher led her from a state of almost feral wildness into education, activism, and intellectual celebrity. The common title of the cycle echoes Mark Twain's description of Sullivan as a "miracle worker". Its first realization was the 1957 Playhouse 90 teleplay of that title by William Gibson. He adapted it for a Broadway production in 1959 and an Oscar-winning feature film in 1962, starring Anne Bancroft and Patty Duke. It was remade for television in 1979 and 2000."

An anime movie called The Story of Helen Keller: Angel of Love and Light was made in 1981.

In 1984, Keller's life story was made into a TV movie called The Miracle Continues. This film, a semi-sequel to The Miracle Worker, recounts her college years and her early adult life. None of the early movies hint at the social activism that would become the hallmark of Keller's later life, although a Disney version produced in 2000 states in the credits that she became an activist for social equality.

The Bollywood movie Black (2005) was largely based on Keller's story, from her childhood to her graduation.

A documentary called Shining Soul: Helen Keller's Spiritual Life and Legacy was produced by the Swedenborg Foundation in the same year. The film focuses on the role played by Emanuel Swedenborg's spiritual theology in her life and how it inspired Keller's triumph over her triple disabilities of blindness, deafness and a severe speech impediment.

On March 6, 2008, the New England Historic Genealogical Society announced that a staff member had discovered a rare 1888 photograph showing Helen and Anne, which, although previously published, had escaped widespread attention. Depicting Helen holding one of her many dolls, it is believed to be the earliest surviving photograph of Anne Sullivan Macy.

Video footage showing Helen Keller learning to mimic speech sounds also exists.

A biography of Helen Keller was written by the German Jewish author Hildegard Johanna Kaeser.

A  painting titled The Advocate: Tribute to Helen Keller was created by three artists from Kerala, India as a tribute to Helen Keller. The Painting was created in association with a non-profit organization Art d'Hope Foundation, artists groups Palette People and XakBoX Design & Art Studio. This painting was created for a fundraising event to help blind students in India and was inaugurated by M. G. Rajamanikyam, IAS (District Collector Ernakulam) on Helen Keller day (June 27, 2016). The painting depicts the major events of Helen Keller's life and is one of the biggest paintings done based on Helen Keller's life.

In 2020, the documentary essay Her Socialist Smile by John Gianvito evolves around Keller's first public talk in 1913 before a general audience, when she started speaking out on behalf of progressive causes.

Posthumous honors

In 1999, Keller was listed in Gallup's Most Widely Admired People of the 20th century.

In 2003, Alabama honored its native daughter on its state quarter. The Alabama state quarter is the only circulating U.S. coin to feature braille.

The Helen Keller Hospital in Sheffield, Alabama, is dedicated to her.

Streets are named after Helen Keller in Zürich, Switzerland; in the U.S, in Getafe, Spain; in Lod, Israel, in Lisbon, Portugal, and in Caen, France.

A preschool for the deaf and hard of hearing in Mysore, India, was originally named after Helen Keller by its founder, K. K. Srinivasan.

In 1973, Helen Keller was inducted into the National Women's Hall of Fame.

A stamp was issued in 1980 by the United States Postal Service depicting Keller and Sullivan, to mark the centennial of Keller's birth. That year her birth was also recognized by a presidential proclamation from U.S. President Jimmy Carter. Pennsylvania annually commemorates her June 27 birthday as Helen Keller Day.

On October 7, 2009, the State of Alabama donated a bronze statue of Keller to the National Statuary Hall Collection, as a replacement for its 1908 statue of education reformer Jabez Lamar Monroe Curry.

See also
 Helen Keller Services for the Blind
 Laura Bridgman
 List of peace activists
 Perkins School for the Blind
 Ragnhild Kåta

Citations

Further reading

 Einhorn, Lois J. (1998). Helen Keller, Public Speaker: Sightless But Seen, Deaf But Heard (Great American Orators)
 Harrity, Richard and Martin, Ralph G. (1962). The Three Lives of Helen Keller.
 Herrmann, Dorothy (1998). Helen Keller: A Life. New York: Knopf. .
 Lash, Joseph P. (1980). Helen and Teacher: The Story of Helen Keller and Anne Sullivan Macy. New York: Delacorte Press. .
 
 Brooks, Van Wyck (1956). Helen Keller Sketch for a Portrait.

Primary sources
 Keller, Helen with Anne Sullivan and John A. Macy (1903). The Story of My Life. New York: Doubleday, Page & Co.

External links

 
 
 
 
 
 
 Helen Keller and Anne Sullivan Collections at Perkins School for the Blind

 
19th-century American non-fiction writers
19th-century American short story writers
19th-century American women writers
20th-century American essayists
20th-century American short story writers
20th-century American women writers
1880 births
1968 deaths
Activists from Alabama
Alabama socialists
American anti-war activists
American birth control activists
American Christian pacifists
American Christian socialists
American Civil Liberties Union people
American democratic socialists
American eugenicists
American feminist writers
20th-century American memoirists
American people of Swiss descent
American people with disabilities
American political activists
American political writers
American suffragists
American Swedenborgians
American women essayists
American women memoirists
American women short story writers
Blind writers
Blind academics
Burials at Washington National Cathedral
Connecticut socialists
Deaf writers
American deafblind people
American disability rights activists
Female Christian socialists
Industrial Workers of the World members
Members of the Socialist Party of America
Non-interventionism
People from Tuscumbia, Alabama
Presidential Medal of Freedom recipients
Proponents of Christian feminism
Radcliffe College alumni
American socialist feminists
Swedenborgian socialists
Women film pioneers
Workers' rights activists
Writers from Alabama
Members of the American Academy of Arts and Letters